Reti (Urdu: ریتی) is a small city of Ghotki District in the Sindh Province of Pakistan.

There are several religious places in the city including mausoleums of Al Mahdi (A.J) Imam Bargah Reti, Pir Fida Hussain Shah, Pir Gulan Shah Bukhari, Shaheed Shahnawas Ghoth, Kamu Shaheed, Dado Bambhlo Shaheed (near Marowala), Hazur Pir, Pir Noor Shah and Many Dargaz and Imam Bargahs.

The Reti railway station is one of the oldest railway stations in Sindh.

There is oil development in the area.

Religion
The Reti is predominantly Muslim, with a small Hindu Menghwar minority.

Al Mahdi (A.J) Imam Bargah Reti 
The Al Mahdi (A.J) Imam Bargah Reti is one of the oldest and most historic Imam Bargah Reti.
Here is an Largest ALam Pak of Sindh.

Schools
 Govt High School Reti
 Govt Boys Primary School (Main) Reti
 Govt Girls Primary School Reti
 Govt Girls Midel School Reti
 Roshan Tara Public School Reti 
 Kids Garden Public School Reti
 Shahlatif Public School Reti

References

Cities and towns in Ghotki District